Jeffrey S. S. Johnson (born January 28, 1970) is an American actor and musician.

Life
Johnson was born and raised in Southborough, Massachusetts, on January 28, 1970. He is a 1988 graduate of Algonquin Regional High School in Northborough, Massachusetts. As an ordained minister with The Universal Life Church, he has married twelve couples, including his sister and her husband in the summer of 2005, and 2 cousins, one of which is a decorated war veteran and his wife in 2009. He currently resides in Los Angeles, California.

Career
Throughout his acting career, Johnson has appeared in or voice-performed various commercials and guest-starred in several television series, including CSI: Crime Scene Investigation, Bones, Boomtown, Lie to Me, and Burn Notice. He has also been seen in films such as Helter Skelter and Scorcher.

Johnson appeared in the 2010 faith-based drama Letters to God, as Brady McDaniels, a troubled mailman who finds inspiration through the wisdom of a young boy stricken with cancer.

In 2012, Johnson starred as the titular character in another faith-based independent film, Worth: The Testimony of Johnny St. James, co-starring Eric Roberts and Vincent Irizarry. He portrays a seminary student dealing with rage and alcoholism after tragically losing his wife and unborn child to a drunk driver, but after a decade he decides to attend an AA meeting and try to get his life back on track, unaware of a shocking twist that will challenge his recovering faith in God.

Musical career
Johnson is a guitarist and singer. He is a member of the rock-&-roll band NSC along with writer, Mike Bernier. Two of his compositions were chosen for the Apparitional/Haunting of Cellblock 11 soundtrack & his single, "Nothin' Will Just Have to Do" was featured in an episode of Bionic Woman.

Video games
In 2012, Johnson had lend his voice as various non-playable characters in the games, TERA and Hitman: Absolution, the fifth entry of the Hitman game series.

Voiceover artist
Johnson has appeared in dozens of TV, Radio & Internet adverts as a voiceover actor.  Most notably the voice of T Mobile starting in 2012.

Filmography

References

External links

1970 births
Living people
American male television actors
American male film actors
People from Southborough, Massachusetts